Jon B. Perdue is an American counter-terrorism author and analyst. He is a special assistant at the Department of the Treasury for the Trump administration. He is also an inventor who appears on season one of the CNBC reality docu-series Make Me a Millionaire Inventor. He has worked for educational and security-related think tanks in Washington, DC and Latin America, and has lectured on asymmetric warfare and strategic communication. He has written for national security publications and has published articles in Investor's Business Daily, The Washington Times, Fox News, The Miami Herald, and The Atlanta Journal-Constitution. He has given testimony on national and international security issues before members of the U.S. congress and to members of the European Parliament.

Early life and education
Perdue grew up in Thomaston, Georgia, and graduated from the University of North Georgia (formerly North Georgia College), a senior military college in Dahlonega, Georgia, with a degree in finance, and served in the Georgia Army National Guard.

Career

Business and non-profit career
Perdue worked for several years as a business consultant, later becoming the vice president of business development for Infectech, a Pennsylvania-based biotech company, until it was acquired by Nutrapharma in October 2003. Following the Nutrapharma acquisition, Perdue moved to Latin America to start a company importing ambulances and medical equipment and setting up medical clinics for underserved patients in partnership with the non-profit Salud sin Fronteras (Healthcare Without Borders). After selling the medical import business in 2004, he began working with non-profit education-focused think tanks in Latin America and the U.S. In 2008, he moved to Washington, DC to become the founding director of the Institute for Leadership in the Americas, a Latin America-focused educational program of The Fund for American Studies.

Counterterrorism career
Perdue began writing on politics and foreign policy in the late 1990s, and had studied radical movements and guerrilla warfare in Latin America since first traveling to the region in 1998. He renewed his writing on the subject after moving to Washington in 2008. In 2012, he was named a Senior Fellow at the Center for a Secure Free Society, an international security think tank based in Washington, DC, and published his first book, The War of All the People: The Nexus of Latin American Radicalism and Middle Eastern Terrorism. He has contributed chapters to several anthologies on national security and asymmetric warfare, and wrote the foreword to the book "Rethinking the Reset Button: Understanding Contemporary Russian Foreign Policy" by Soviet defector Evgueni Novikov. He also contributed a chapter titled "A Marriage of Radical Ideologies" for the book Iran's Strategic Penetration of Latin America (Lexington Books, 2014). Perdue has worked unofficially on three presidential campaigns, contributing foreign policy and counterterrorism policy advice.

Human rights career
Perdue began working on human rights issues in 2000, when he traveled to Cuba to report on the condition of ordinary Cubans and dissidents, publishing an article on the subject in Investor’s Business Daily. In 2008, he wrote a series of articles that were published in the U.S. and Peru concerning a Peruvian general that had been falsely accused of collaborating with narcotraffickers in the VRAE region of Peru, a notorious trafficking area. The exposé aided in the general's subsequent exoneration by the Peruvian Supreme Court. In 2009, he traveled to Honduras as part of the Washington Senior Observer Group for the historic presidential election as an international election observer. In 2010, he served as an expert witness in a precedent-setting human rights trial in the Miami Circuit Court, which prevented the extradition of a U.S. citizen to Argentina, the defendant's native country. In 2012, Perdue began writing articles highlighting the abrogation of free speech in Ecuador, after President Rafael Correa ostensibly "used the courts, under what could be considered dictatorial powers, to jail journalists for calling him a dictator.” Correa had actually sued the editorial page editor of El Universo, an Ecuadorian newspaper, for saying, in an opinion piece, that he was acting like a dictator. The editorial page editor, Emilio Palacio, was subsequently forced to seek asylum in the U.S. In 2013, Perdue attended the Human Rights Foundation’s annual Oslo Freedom Forum in Oslo, Norway, to interview Cuban dissident and leader of the Ladies in White, Berta Soler, and wrote an article for the Miami Herald on Soler and the racial discrimination suffered by Afro-Cubans under the Castro dictatorship. He also interviewed Tutu Alicante, a human rights activist from Equatorial Guinea, and published an article for the UK Commentator in London.

Television career

On the first season of CNBC's invention docu-series Make Me a Millionaire Inventor, Perdue is featured on the season finale, showcasing the "Packbow," his archery invention. He has also served as a security analyst for several international TV outlets, including Latin American news channel NTN24 and China-based news channel China Central Television (CCTV).

Trump administration
Following the election of Donald Trump in 2016, Perdue served on the administration's beach head team for the Department of the Treasury, serving as a special assistant.

Awards
Perdue received the International Young Leader Award in Buenos Aires, Argentina in 2009, given by Jovenes Lideres Internacional, and the Global Leadership Award in London, England in 2010, presented by the Bow Group, London's oldest conservative think tank.

Bibliography

References

External links
 

American male writers
Living people
American inventors
Counterterrorism theorists
People from Thomaston, Georgia
Year of birth missing (living people)
21st-century American writers